Argyripa lansbergei is a species of flower chafer belonging to the family scarab beetles.

Description
Argyripa lansbergei is a medium-sized flower chafer without metallic sheen. The color of the body is yellow with black dots.

Distribution
This species is widespread in Central America and in the northern of South America (Brazil, Colombia, Ecuador).

References

Cetoniinae
Beetles described in 1857